Hippopotamus is a genus of artiodactyl mammals consisting of one extant species, Hippopotamus amphibius, the river hippopotamus (or simply the hippopotamus), and several extinct species from both recent and prehistoric times. It belongs to the family Hippopotamidae, which also includes the pygmy hippopotamus (Choeropsis liberiensis) and a number of extinct genera.

Species
The species of the genus Hippopotamus include:

Extant species

 Hippopotamus amphibius, hippopotamus

Extinct species

 †Hippopotamus lemerlei, Lemerle's dwarf hippopotamus
†Hippopotamus madagascariensis, Madagascar dwarf hippopotamus
†Hippopotamus aethiopicus
 †Hippopotamus antiquus, European hippopotamus
†Hippopotamus behemoth
†Hippopotamus creutzburgi, Cretan dwarf hippopotamus
†Hippopotamus gorgops
†Hippopotamus kaisensis
†Hippopotamus laloumena, Malagasy hippopotamus
†Hippopotamus major
†Hippopotamus melitensis, Maltese hippopotamus
†Hippopotamus minor, Cyprus dwarf hippopotamus (synonym Phanourios minor)
†Hippopotamus pentlandi, Sicilian hippopotamus
†Hippopotamus sirensis

References

Hippopotamuses
Mammal genera
Mammal genera with one living species
Taxa named by Carl Linnaeus